Vallée-des-Rivières is a town in the Canadian province of New Brunswick. It was formed through the 2023 New Brunswick local governance reforms.

History 
Vallée-des-Rivières was incorporated on January 1, 2023 via the amalgamation of the former town of Saint-Léonard and the former village of Sainte-Anne-de Madawaska as well as the concurrent annexation of adjacent unincorporated areas. The adjacent unincorporated areas included portions of the former local service districts of Notre-Dame-de-Lourdes, Rivière-Verte, Sainte-Anne and Saint-Léonard.

Government 
The community's first municipal election was held in November 2022 as part of the 2022 New Brunswick municipal elections, with Saint-Léonard mayor Lise Anne Roussel elected as the new mayor.

See also 
List of communities in New Brunswick
List of municipalities in New Brunswick

References 

2023 establishments in New Brunswick
2023 New Brunswick local governance reform
Communities in Madawaska County, New Brunswick
Populated places established in 2023
Towns in New Brunswick